Freddie James is a former American football coach. He played under Billy Nicks at Prairie View A&M in the late 1950s, before working in a steel plant for a couple of years, then as a physical therapist in Houston, Texas. His former coach Nicks later recommended him for high school football coaching. In 1982 James became head coach at David W. Carter High School in Dallas, Texas. In his first year, Carter reached the 5A state semifinals. In 1988, Carter won the title after one of the most dominant seasons in Texas high school football, but the title was later forfeited because of eligibility infringements. After a ban from the state playoffs in 1989, because James had played an ineligible player, Carter reached the state semis again in 1990. He retired after the 1995 season, having guided the Carter Cowboys to a 123-22-3 record in his 14 seasons, and having turned the program into a nationally recognized power. His overall coaching record stands 147-28-4.

James was inducted to the Texas Black Sports Hall of Fame in 1996 (inaugural class). He was portrayed in the 2004 movie Friday Night Lights by actor Julius Tennon. He was also portrayed in the 2015 film Carter High by Charles S. Dutton, which portrayed Carter's 1988 Season.

References

1937 births
Living people
Prairie View A&M Panthers football players
High school football coaches in Texas
Sportspeople from Texas
African-American coaches of American football
African-American players of American football
21st-century African-American people
20th-century African-American sportspeople